Philip Clarke may refer to:
 Philip Clarke (Royal Navy officer) (1898–1966), British admiral
 Philip Clarke (politician) (born 1933), Irish Republican Army member and politician
 Philip L. Clarke, American voice actor 
 Philip Clarke (businessman) (born 1960), British businessman
 Several of the Clarke baronets were called Philip Clarke
 Phil Clarke (born 1971), English rugby league player
Phil Clarke (rugby union), New Zealand rugby union player
 Phil Clarke (American football) (born 1977), American football player
 Phil Clarke (TV producer), British comedy producer & television executive
Phil Clarke (speedway rider), English speedway rider

See also
Philip Clark (disambiguation)
Clarke (surname)